Felipe N. Torres (May 26, 1897 – April 3, 1994) was an American politician who served in the New York State Assembly from 1953 to 1962 and appointed the first Puerto Rican Judge of the Family Court, State of New York in 1963.

Felipe N. Torees graduated from Ponce High School. He served in the United States Army as a Second Lieutenant infantry officer. In 1919 he traveled alone to New York City; his goal to attend college. Worked as dishwasher at the Commodore Hotel, and others jobs as jackhammer operator at the Brooklyn Navy Yard, and the United States Post Office. Felipe graduated with a Bachelor of Science in 1940 from City College of New York and obtained his Bachelor of Laws from Fordham University School of Law in New York in 1925.

He died on April 3, 1994, in White Plains, New York at age 96.

References

1897 births
1994 deaths
City College of New York alumni
Fordham University School of Law alumni
Democratic Party members of the New York State Assembly
People from Salinas, Puerto Rico
Puerto Rican people in New York (state) politics
United States Army officers
20th-century American politicians